Copeman is a surname. Notable people with the surname include:

 Constance Copeman (1864–1953), English painter
 Fred Copeman (1907–1983), English volunteer during the Spanish Civil War
 Lloyd Groff Copeman (1881–1956), American inventor
 Sir Nicholas Copeman (1906–1969), Royal Navy officer 
 Nick Copeman (born 1979), author
 Peter Copeman FRCS (1932–2018), English dermatologist 
 Russell Copeman (born 1960), Canadian politician
 Sydney Copeman (1862–1947), British doctor
 Thomas H. Copeman III, United States Navy officer
 William Copeman (1900–1970), rheumatologist